In mathematical logic, algebraic semantics is a formal semantics based on algebras studied as part of algebraic logic. For example, the modal logic S4 is characterized by the class of topological boolean algebras—that is, boolean algebras with an interior operator. Other modal logics are characterized by various other algebras with operators. The class of boolean algebras characterizes classical propositional logic, and the class of Heyting algebras propositional intuitionistic logic. MV-algebras are the algebraic semantics of Łukasiewicz logic.

See also
 Algebraic semantics (computer science)
 Lindenbaum–Tarski algebra

Further reading
  (2nd published by ASL in 2009) open access at Project Euclid
 
 
  Good introduction for readers with prior exposure to non-classical logics but without much background in order theory and/or universal algebra; the book covers these prerequisites at length. The book, however, has been criticized for poor and sometimes incorrect presentation of abstract algebraic logic results. 

Mathematical logic